Timms' Point and Landing is a California Historical Landmark at Los Angeles harbor in the San Pedro neighborhood of Los Angeles.  It is a Los Angeles Historic-Cultural Monument, listed in 1977 as Site of Timm's Landing.

The area was a shipping center in mid-19th century.  No original structures remain.  It is located at northwest end of fish slip and includes a landscaped park in front of Fishermen's Co-op building, east of the harbor bel railroad tracks

Marker
The California State marker on the site reads:"
NO. 384 TIMMS' POINT AND LANDING - In 1852 German immigrant Augustus W. Timms obtained Sepúlveda's Landing on the mudflats near here. He built a wharf, added a warehouse, corral and other facilities to service shipping and the running of stages to Los Angeles. Timms was a pioneer in the development of the harbor and for over fifty years this area was known as Timms Point.

See also
 List of Los Angeles Historic-Cultural Monuments in the Harbor area
California Historical Landmarks in Los Angeles County

References

California Historical Landmarks
Los Angeles Historic-Cultural Monuments
San Pedro, Los Angeles